The Bulgaria national korfball team is managed by the Bulgarian Federation Korfball and Intercrosse, representing Bulgaria in korfball international competitions.

Tournament history

References 

National korfball teams
Korfball
National team